Kunjar / Kunjir (कुंजर / कुंजीर) surname is inherited from Nagvanshi raja Kunjar, who is son of Krishi Kashyap from her wife Kudru. Nagvanshi's are spread across the India from their origin place Patal Desh means Konkan(कोंकण), Maharashtra at present. This surname is commonly found in the maratha kshatriya peoples.

Kunjar / Kunjir's origin belongs to Konkan of Patal Desh at present Maharashtra. Later, some of the Kunjir families moved to nearby state of Maharashtra like Gujrat and Madhya Pradesh etc.
Kunjir family has long enjoyed the privileges of sar-patil of 360 villages and towns in the Subha of Poona.

Notable persons of the family 

 Balaji Kunjar
 Pandoji Kunjar
 Sambhajirao Kunjir

References

Indian surnames